The following is a list of the 66 municipalities (comuni) of the Province of Imperia, Liguria, Italy.

List

See also

References 

 01
Imperia